The Apostolic Vicariate of Jimma–Bonga is a Roman Catholic pre-diocesan missionary jurisdiction in southwestern Ethiopia.

It is exempt, i.e. directly dependent on the Holy See (Roman missionary Congregation for the Evangelization of Peoples), not part of any ecclesiastical province.

Its episcopal see is the Pro-Cathedral Lideta Mariam, in Bonga town in Jimma, in the Keffa Zone of the Southern Nations, Nationalities and Peoples Region.

History 
Established on 1994.06.10 as Apostolic Prefecture of Jimma–Bonga (Gimma–Bonga in Curiate Italiano), on territory split off from the Apostolic Vicariate of Nekemte.

Lost territory on 2000.11.16 to establish the Apostolic Prefecture of Gambella.

Promoted on 2009.12.05 as Apostolic Vicariate of Jimma–Bonga.

Ordinaries 
(all Latin Church)
Apostolic Prefects of Jimma–Bonga
Father Berhaneyesus Demerew Souraphiel, C.M. (1994 - 11.07.1997), appointed Apostolic Administrator of Addis Abeba (Ethiopian) (Cardinal in 2015)
Father Theodorus van Ruijven (van Ruyven), C.M. (07.09.1998 - 07.23.2009), appointed Vicar Apostolic of Nekemte
Apostolic Vicars of Jimma–Bonga
 Markos Ghebremedhin, Lazarists (C.M.) (2009.12.05 – ...), Titular Bishop of Gummi in Proconsulari (2009.12.05 – ...)

See also 
Roman Catholicism in Ethiopia

References

External links 
 GCatholic with incumbent bio links

1994 establishments in Ethiopia
Catholicism in Ethiopia
Apostolic vicariates